Vinzenz Lüps (born 26 February 1981) is a German snowboarder. He competed in the men's halfpipe event at the 2006 Winter Olympics.

References

1981 births
Living people
German male snowboarders
Olympic snowboarders of Germany
Snowboarders at the 2006 Winter Olympics
Sportspeople from Munich
21st-century German people